Queens Road Cricket Ground was a cricket ground in Wisbech, Cambridgeshire.  The first recorded match on the ground was in 1851, when Wisbech played an All-England Eleven.

The ground held a single first-class match when Cambridgeshire played Yorkshire in 1867.

The site of the ground today would be along Queens Road, which still exists within Wisbech today. Its likely location would be at the northern end of Queens Road.

References

External links
Queens Road Cricket Ground on CricketArchive
Queens Road Cricket Ground on Cricinfo

Defunct cricket grounds in England
Cricket grounds in Cambridgeshire
Fenland District
Defunct sports venues in Cambridgeshire
Sports venues completed in 1851
1851 establishments in England